The 2001 North Dakota State Bison football team was an American football team that represented North Dakota State University during the 2001 NCAA Division II football season as a member of the North Central Conference. In their fifth year under head coach Bob Babich, the team compiled a 7–3 record.

Schedule

Notes

References

North Dakota State
North Dakota State Bison football seasons
North Dakota State Bison football